Terry Tweed (born 23 March 1943 in Toronto, Ontario, Canada) is a Canadian actress, playwright and theatre director from Toronto, Ontario.

Career
Primarily known as a stage actress, her roles have included productions of Balconville, Blood Relations, Romeo and Juliet, The Glace Bay Miners' Museum, Driving Miss Daisy, Another Home Invasion, Over the River and Through the Woods, Homechild, Orpheus Descending, The Comedy of Errors and Happy Days, while she has directed productions of Blood Brothers, The Women, Arcadia, Gypsy, Salt Water Moon, Our Town and Albertine in Five Times.

She also starred in the television sitcoms Delilah and The Baxters, and as Lillian Massey in the 1978 television film The Masseys, as well as making guest appearances on Katts and Dog, Street Legal and Skins.

She was cowriter of two plays, Lockhartville (an adaptation of Alden Nowlan's novel Various Persons Named Kevin O'Brien) and On My Own Two Feet.

She is a former professor of theatre at the University of Ottawa, and a former president of the Canadian Actors' Equity Association. She currently teaches theatre at Humber College and at the Birmingham Conservatory of the Stratford Festival.

References

External links

Canadian film actresses
Canadian television actresses
Canadian stage actresses
Actresses from Toronto
Canadian theatre directors
20th-century Canadian dramatists and playwrights
20th-century Canadian actresses
21st-century Canadian actresses
Academic staff of the University of Ottawa
1943 births
Living people
Academic staff of Humber College
Canadian women dramatists and playwrights
20th-century Canadian women writers